Love & Consequences is the third studio album by the American R&B singer Gerald Levert. It was released on July 21, 1998, on East West Records. In addition to his longtime collaborator, Edwin "Tony" Nicholas, Levert worked with more writers and producers including R. Kelly, Joe Little III of The Rude Boys (whom Levert discovered) and Darrell "Delite" Allamby. A commercial success, it peaked at number 17 on the US Billboard 200 and at number two on the Top R&B/Hip-Hop Albums, while receiving a platinum certification from the Recording Industry Association of America (RIAA).

Track listing

Charts

Weekly charts

Year-end charts

Certifications

References

1998 albums
Gerald Levert albums
East West Records albums